Dorsal digital nerves of radial nerve are branches on the dorsum of the hand.

They run with the dorsal digital arteries.

External links
 

Nerves of the upper limb